The Fyodor Shalyapin (former Kliment Voroshilov) is a Valerian Kuybyshev-class (92-016, OL400) Soviet/Russian river cruise ship, cruising in the Volga basin. The ship was built by Slovenské Lodenice at their shipyard in Komárno, Czechoslovakia, and entered service in 1977. At 3,950 tonnes, Fyodor Shalyapin is one of the world's biggest river cruise ships. Her sister ships are Valerian Kuybyshev, Mikhail Frunze, Feliks Dzerzhinskiy, Sergey Kuchkin, Mstislav Rostropovich, Aleksandr Suvorov, Semyon Budyonnyy and Georgiy Zhukov. Fyodor Shalyapin is currently operated by Vodohod, a Russian river cruise line. Her home port is currently Nizhny Novgorod.

Features
The ship has two restaurants, three bars, solarium, sauna and resting area.

See also
 List of river cruise ships

References

External links

Теплоход "Фёдор Шаляпин" 
Project 92-016 
Home page of the Fyodor Shalyapin

1977 ships
River cruise ships
Ships built in Czechoslovakia